The 2013–14 season of the Women's 2. Bundesliga was the tenth season of Germany's second-tier women's football league.

Changes
In June 2013, 1. FC Lok Leipzig decided to remove the women team from being part of the club and the new women team played under the name of FFV Leipzig.

North

League table

Results

Updated to games played on 1 June 2014

South

League table

Results

Updated to games played on 1 June 2014

Relegation play-offs
Blau-Weiß Hohen Neuendorf, who finished 10th in the South division, and ETSV Würzburg, who finished 10th in the North division, will participate in a two-legged tie. The loser on aggregate score after both matches will be relegated to the Regionalliga.

First leg

Second leg

ETSV Würzburg win 5–4 on aggregate

Top scorers

References

2013-14
2